Geoffrey Nunberg (June 1, 1945– August 11, 2020) was an American lexical semantician and author. In 2001 he received the Linguistics, Language, and the Public Interest Award from the Linguistic Society of America for his contributions to National Public Radio's Fresh Air, and he has published a number of popular press books including Going Nucular: Language, Politics and Culture in Controversial Times (2004). Nunberg is primarily known for his public-facing work interpreting linguistic science for lay audiences, though his contributions to linguistic theory are also well regarded. 

Nunberg received his doctorate from the City University of New York (CUNY) in 1977 for his dissertation, The Pragmatics of Reference. Prior to his PhD, Nunberg received a Bachelor's degree from Columbia University and a master's degree from the University of Pennsylvania where he studied under William Labov. Following his education, Nunberg began working as a postdoctoral scholar at the University of California Berkeley and visiting professor at Stanford University. In the mid-1980s he moved to the Xerox Palo Alto Research Center where he worked until 2001. Following Xerox, he returned to research at universities, returning to appointments at Stanford's Center for the Study of Language and Information and at Berkeley's School of Information.

Following a long battle with cancer, Nunberg died August 11, 2020.

Life 
Nunberg was born in 1945 to his mother, a high school teacher, and his father, a commercial real estate worker. He grew up in the suburbs of New York City, and as a teenager he was attracted to the growing beatnik scene in nearby Greenwich Village. He graduated from Scarsdale High School to attend Columbia University, but left to pursue an art degree at the Art Students League of New York. While in art school, he began writing as a side project but eventually left art school to re-enroll at Columbia from where he ultimately received his Bachelor's degree.

Interests and writing

As a linguist, he is best known for his work on lexical semantics, in particular on the phenomena of polysemy, deferred reference and indexicality.  He also wrote extensively about the cultural and social implications of new technologies. Nunberg's criticisms of the metadata of Google Books ignited a widespread controversy among librarians and scholars.

Nunberg was a frequent contributor to the collective blog Language Log.

Nunberg commented on language, usage, and society for National Public Radio's Fresh Air program since 1988.  His commentaries on language also appeared frequently in The New York Times and other publications.  He was the emeritus chair of the American Heritage Dictionary usage panel.  His books for general audiences include The Way We Talk Now: Commentaries on Language and Culture from NPR's Fresh Air, Going : Language, Politics, and Culture in Controversial Times,  Talking Right: How Conservatives Turned Liberalism into a Tax-Raising, Latte-Drinking, Sushi-Eating, Volvo-Driving, New York Times-Reading, Body-Piercing, Hollywood-Loving, Left-Wing Freak Show, and  The Years of Talking Dangerously (2009).

He's one of the contributors to The Cambridge grammar of the English language.

His last book, Ascent of the A-Word: Assholism, the First Sixty Years, was published in August 2012. The critic Malcolm Jones described Nunberg's method in that book as follows: "His means of studying the problem is utterly fresh: take a word, and the attitudes behind it and see where they came from and what they might say about us."

References

External links

 Nunberg's website
 The Persistence of English—an essay by Nunberg regarding the diversity and unity of the English language through its history (PDF)
 Wikipedia: Blessing or Curse?, Fresh Air commentary, June 5, 2007 (audio)
 A Wiki's as Good as a Nod, Fresh Air commentary, June 5, 2007 (transcript)
 Alex Soojung-Kim Pang:  (2006)
 
 Google Books: The Metadata Mess, a slide presentation from the Google Book Settlement Conf at UC Berkeley on 28 August 2009
 Google's Book Search: A Disaster for Scholars, article in The Chronicle of Higher Education
 Counting on Google Books, article in The Chronicle of Higher Education

1945 births
2020 deaths
Writers from New York City
Sociolinguists
Semanticists
University of California, Berkeley faculty
Stanford University Department of Linguistics faculty
Linguists from the United States
21st-century American non-fiction writers
Scientists at PARC (company)
21st-century American male writers
20th-century American non-fiction writers
20th-century American male writers
21st-century linguists
20th-century linguists
American male non-fiction writers
Columbia College (New York) alumni
University of Pennsylvania alumni
City University of New York alumni